The 1985 Galician regional election was held on Sunday, 24 November 1985, to elect the 2nd Parliament of the autonomous community of Galicia. All 71 seats in the Parliament were up for election.

Overview

Electoral system
The Parliament of Galicia was the devolved, unicameral legislature of the autonomous community of Galicia, having legislative power in regional matters as defined by the Spanish Constitution of 1978 and the regional Statute of Autonomy, as well as the ability to vote confidence in or withdraw it from a regional president.

Voting for the Parliament was on the basis of universal suffrage, which comprised all nationals over 18 years of age, registered in Galicia and in full enjoyment of their political rights. The 71 members of the Parliament of Galicia were elected using the D'Hondt method and a closed list proportional representation, with an electoral threshold of three percent of valid votes—which included blank ballots—being applied in each constituency. Parties not reaching the threshold were not taken into consideration for seat distribution. Seats were allocated to constituencies, corresponding to the provinces of La Coruña, Lugo, Orense and Pontevedra, with each being allocated a fixed number of seats: 22 for La Coruña, 15 for Lugo, 15 for Orense and 19 for Pontevedra.

The use of the D'Hondt method might result in a higher effective threshold, depending on the district magnitude.

The electoral law allowed for parties and federations registered in the interior ministry, coalitions and groupings of electors to present lists of candidates. Parties and federations intending to form a coalition ahead of an election were required to inform the relevant Electoral Commission within ten days of the election call, whereas groupings of electors needed to secure the signature of at least one percent of the electorate in the constituencies for which they sought election, disallowing electors from signing for more than one list of candidates.

Election date
The term of the Parliament of Galicia expired four years after the date of its previous election. The election decree was required to be issued no later than the twenty-fifth day prior to the date of expiry of parliament and published on the following day in the Official Journal of Galicia (DOG), with election day taking place between the fifty-fourth and the sixtieth day from publication. The previous election was held on 20 October 1981, which meant that the legislature's term would have expired on 20 October 1985. The election decree was required to be published in the DOG no later than 26 September 1985, with the election taking place up to the sixtieth day from publication, setting the latest possible election date for the Parliament on Monday, 25 November 1985.

The Parliament of Galicia could not be dissolved before the date of expiry of parliament except in the event of an investiture process failing to elect a regional president within a two-month period from the first ballot. In such a case,  the Parliament was to be automatically dissolved and a snap election called.

Opinion polls
The table below lists voting intention estimates in reverse chronological order, showing the most recent first and using the dates when the survey fieldwork was done, as opposed to the date of publication. Where the fieldwork dates are unknown, the date of publication is given instead. The highest percentage figure in each polling survey is displayed with its background shaded in the leading party's colour. If a tie ensues, this is applied to the figures with the highest percentages. The "Lead" column on the right shows the percentage-point difference between the parties with the highest percentages in a poll. When available, seat projections determined by the polling organisations are displayed below (or in place of) the percentages in a smaller font; 36 seats were required for an absolute majority in the Parliament of Galicia.

Results

Overall

Distribution by constituency

Aftermath

Government formation

1987 motion of no confidence

Notes

References
Opinion poll sources

Other

1985 in Galicia (Spain)
Galicia
Regional elections in Galicia (Spain)
November 1985 events in Europe